The Jardins des Martels is a  commercial botanical garden and flower park located in Giroussens, Tarn, Occitanie, France. It is open daily in the warmer months; an admission fee is charged.

The gardens were created by Marie-Thérèse and André Reynier in the late 1960s, as a private garden on their farm, and after considerable development opened to the public in 1994. Today the garden is set upon a well-landscaped terrain of numerous pools and hills, and features more than 2500 plant varieties from five continents, as well as a greenhouse of aquatic plants and a mini-farm with about 150 animals such as sheep, goats, ponies, ducks, and so forth.

See also 
 List of botanical gardens in France

References 
 Jardins des Martels
 1001 Fleurs entry (French)
 Botanic.com entry (French)
 Conservatoire des Jardins et Paysages entry (French)
 Gralon entry (French)

Gardens in Tarn (department)
Botanical gardens in France